The Wannihorn is a mountain of the Bernese Alps, located north of Hohtenn in the canton of Valais. It lies south of the Wilerhorn, on the range between the lower Lötschental and the Jolital.

References

External links
 Wannihorn on Hikr

Mountains of the Alps
Alpine three-thousanders
Mountains of Switzerland
Mountains of Valais
Bernese Alps